Abel Picabea Allero (20 June 1906 – Unknown) was an Argentine football manager and player. He played as a midfielder.

Career
Born in Buenos Aires, Picabea started his career with San Lorenzo before representing Estudiantil Porteño and Rosario Central in his homeland. In 1937, he moved to Brazil and joined São Cristóvão, where he retired in 1941.

Immediately after retiring Picabea took up coaching, with his first managerial club being Canto do Rio. He subsequently returned to São Cristóvão and won the Taça da Prefeitura do Distrito Federal in 1943. 

In 1946, after being in charge of Madureira, Picabea was appointed manager of Santos, becoming the club's first Argentine manager; he is also the foreign manager who managed the club for the most times. He subsequently worked at Portuguesa Santista, América Mineiro, Olaria, Palmeiras, Ferroviária and Portuguesa, winning the Fita Azul with the latter.

Picabea arrived at Sporting CP in the later stages of the 1955–56 season, he was in charge of the club during the whole 1956–57 campaign before taking over Real Oviedo in the Spanish Segunda División. After winning the second division with the club, he was later in charge of neighbouring Sporting de Gijón before returning to Brazil in 1960 with Vasco da Gama.

Honours

Manager
São Cristóvão
Taça da Prefeitura do Distrito Federal: 1943

Oviedo
Segunda División: 1957–58

References

External links

1906 births
Date of death unknown
Footballers from Buenos Aires
Argentine footballers
Association football defenders
San Lorenzo de Almagro footballers
Club Almagro players
Barracas Central players
Rosario Central footballers
São Cristóvão de Futebol e Regatas players
Argentine expatriate footballers
Expatriate footballers in Brazil
Argentine expatriate sportspeople in Brazil
Argentine football managers
Canto do Rio Foot-Ball Club managers
São Cristóvão de Futebol e Regatas managers
Madureira Esporte Clube managers
Santos FC managers
Associação Atlética Portuguesa (Santos) managers
América Futebol Clube (MG) managers
Olaria Atlético Clube managers
Sociedade Esportiva Palmeiras managers
Associação Ferroviária de Esportes managers
Associação Portuguesa de Desportos managers
CR Vasco da Gama managers
Primeira Liga managers
Sporting CP managers
La Liga managers
Segunda División managers
Real Oviedo managers
Sporting de Gijón managers
Argentine expatriate football managers
Expatriate football managers in Brazil
Expatriate football managers in Portugal
Expatriate football managers in Spain